"The Naked Truth" is the second episode of the seventh season of the CBS sitcom How I Met Your Mother, and the 138th episode overall. It first aired on September 19, 2011.

Plot
Marshall is still hungover after Punchy's wedding, and makes a "sweeping declaration" that he will henceforth permanently stay sober. Future Ted says that Marshall's "sweeping declarations" typically do not work. Marshall receives a call from Garrison Cootes, a partner at one of the nation's largest environmental law firms. He tells Marshall that the company is interested in Marshall's application for employment, and he will receive a job offer after the company completes an extensive background check. The danger of a background check concerns Marshall, who fears that a college-era video of him streaking through Wesleyan calling himself "Beercules", which is now available online, could result in Garrison dropping the job offer. Marshall contacts the uploader, Pete Durkenson, an old college acquaintance, and asks him to remove the video. However, Marshall ends up getting drunk and streaking again after inadvertently playing Edward Fortyhands with Pete, and thus another "Beercules" video is uploaded. Pete's refusal to take it down prompts Lily to blackmail him with information that she claims to have received from women who dated him in college. Eventually, Garrison does see the video, but offers Marshall a job anyway; the video is not an issue with him. Later, Pete calls Marshall and offers to remove the video, but Marshall refuses.

Thinking about a date with Nora, Barney appears to the gang in a leg cast and using crutches; he hopes to use these to gain Nora's sympathy. He meets Nora at a 24-hour diner, where he is forced to explain to her all the plays he ever made on women, one of which irks a woman in an adjoining booth who overhears the conversation; she turns out to be one of Barney's previous conquests. Nora leaves, still angry at Barney for lying to her. To prove to Nora that he will never lie to her again, Barney vows not to leave the diner until she agrees to a second date. The gang eats at the diner nine hours later and sees Barney wake up. He refuses to make an order several times, and true to his word, does stay at the diner the whole time, which convinces Nora when she comes back.

Ted capitalizes on being featured in New York magazine, speaking to women at newsstands when they pick up a copy of the magazine. He befriends 16 people, 13 of them being women, and dates two women from amongst them on separate occasions. With Lily's and Robin's help, he must decide on one of the women as a date to the exclusive "Architect's Ball". Robin thinks that the event will be boring, but hints that she would like to become Ted's date when he mentions that Lenny Kravitz will be at the event, since she is an avid fan of the rock star. Ted winds up taking Robin to the gala, where she discovers that the Lenny Kravitz Ted was referring to is an old architect, Leonard Kravitz. Disappointed, Robin leaves the party. Future Ted tells his kids that a person will know for sure about falling in love "pretty quickly and with absolute certainty." While looking at the gala guests, he sees his former girlfriend Victoria arranging cupcakes at a table and they establish eye contact.

Critical response

Donna Bowman of The A.V. Club graded the episode a B. Robert Canning of IGN gave the show an 8 out of 10. Angel Cohn of Television Without Pity gave the episode a C.

Despite the show being in its 7th season this episode premiered to 12.22 million viewers, making it the show's third most watched episode, only behind the two-part series finale "Last Forever" and season one's "The Pineapple Incident".

References

External links

How I Met Your Mother (season 7) episodes
2011 American television episodes